is a legendary Japanese tree in the Edo period Konjaku Hyakki Shūi by Toriyama Sekien.

Concept
The picture depicts it as a tree blooming flowers like human heads, with the following explanatory text:

Besides Japanese yōkai, the Konjaku Hyakki Shūi also included publications of plants, animals and yōkai outside of Japan and this "jinmenju" as well as the Wakan Sansai Zue quote from the Sancai Tuhui and it depicts a tree from a land called "Daishikoku" (大食国, big-eat country).

According to the Sancai Tuhui, Daishikoku is a land thousand ri southwest, with flowers like human hands, and upon asking it questions, its flowers would laugh, but it wouldn't understand human language and if they laugh too much, the flowers would wither and fall. The Rōō Sawa (老媼茶話), a collection of strange tales  from Aizu, also quotes the Sancai Tuhui while making statements about this tree.

In popular culture
The Pokémon Exeggutor is based on the jinmenju.

See also
 Wāḳwāḳ
 Nariphon

Notes

External links
  (English)
  (Japanese)
　

Mythological human hybrids
Trees in mythology
Yōkai
Yaoguai
Mythological monsters
Monsters